The One is Chubb Rock's third full-length album. It was released on May 21, 1991 by Select Records and reached #13 on Billboards Top R&B/Hip-Hop Albums chart for that year. Three singles from the album, "Treat 'Em Right", "Just the Two of Us" and "The Chubbster" reached #1 on Billboards Hot Rap Singles chart list for the same year.

Track listing 
 The One (4:41)
 Just the Two of Us (3:34) 
 Treat 'Em Right (4:43)
 The Big Man (3:55) 
 The Night Scene (4:25) 
 Bad Boyz (2:46) 
 What's the Word (4:01)
 Organizer (3:22)
 The Chubbster (3:53) 
 Cat (3:36) 
 Another Statistic (2:39) 
 Enjoy Ya Self (2:49) 
 The Five Deadly Venoms (3:47) 
 Bring 'Em Home Safely feat. Lucas Secon, Pete Nice & Lady of Rage (5:21)
 Keep It Street (2:39)
 The Regiments of Steel (4:48)

Charts

Weekly charts

Year-end charts

References

External links 
 http://www.allmusic.com/album/one-r27707

Chubb Rock albums
1991 albums
Select Records albums